Mesothen epimetheus is a moth of the subfamily Arctiinae. It was described by William Schaus in 1892. It is found in Rio de Janeiro, Brazil.

References

Further reading

Mesothen (moth)
Moths described in 1892